Martin Scorsese Presents the Blues: Jimi Hendrix is a ten track companion release to the critically acclaimed television documentary series Martin Scorsese Presents The Blues shown on PBS in September 2003.

The album features two previously unreleased blues inspired performances. "Georgia Blues" (recorded on March 19, 1969 at New York's Record Plant Studios) was recorded with saxophonist Lonnie Youngblood, with whom Hendrix played some early sessions in 1966. Also previously unreleased is "Blue Window", recorded in March 1969 at Mercury Studios in New York. This track features Buddy Miles Express members: Buddy Miles on drums, Duane Hitchings on organ, Bill Rich on bass guitar and brass players Tobie Wynn, James Tatum, Bobby Rock, Pete Carter, and Tom Hall (now known as Khalil Shaheed).

Track listing
"Red House" – 3:50
"Voodoo Chile" – 15:00
"Come On (Let the Good Times Roll)" – 4:09
"Georgia Blues" – 7:57
"Country Blues" – 8:26
"Hear My Train A Comin'" – 6:57
"It's Too Bad" – 8:52
"My Friend" – 4:36
"Blue Window" – 12:51
"Midnight Lightning" – 3:06

Recording details
Track 1 recorded in London at CBS Studios on Dec. 13, 1966; De Lane Lea Studios on Feb. 1967; Olympic Studios in Apr. 1967
Track 2 recorded at Record Plant in New York City on May 2, 1968
Track 3 recorded at Record Plant in New York City on Aug. 27, 1968
Track 4 recorded at Record Plant in New York City  on Mar. 19, 1969
Track 5 recorded at Record Plant in New York City on Jan. 23, 1970
Track 6 recorded at Olympic Studios in London on Feb. 17, 1969
Track 7 recorded at Record Plant in New York City on Feb. 11, 1969
Track 8 recorded at Sound Center in New York City on Mar. 13, 1968
Track 9 recorded at Mercury Studios in New York City in Mar. 1969
Track 10 recorded at Record Plant in New York City on Mar. 23, 1970

Personnel
Jimi Hendrixguitar, vocals
Mitch Mitchell, Jimmy Mayes, Buddy Milesdrums
Noel Redding, Jack Casady, Hank Anderson, Billy Cox, Bill Richbass
Lonnie Youngbloodvocals, saxophone
Ken Pine12-string guitar
Paul Carusoharmonica
Bobby Rocktenor saxophone
Tobie Wynnbaritone saxophone
Tom Hall (Khalil Shaheed), Pete Cartertrumpet
Stephen Stillspiano
Steve Winwoodorgan
Duane Hitchingsorgan
John Winfieldorgan

References

Compilation albums published posthumously
Jimi Hendrix compilation albums
2003 compilation albums
Albums produced by Eddie Kramer
MCA Records compilation albums
Blues rock compilation albums